Werner of Steusslingen may refer to:

Werner of Magdeburg (died 1078), archbishop
 (died 1151), bishop